Rush Hour is a 1998 American buddy action comedy film directed by Brett Ratner and written by Jim Kouf and Ross LaManna from a story by LaManna. It stars Jackie Chan and Chris Tucker as mismatched police officers who are assigned to rescue a Chinese diplomat's abducted daughter. Tzi Ma, Tom Wilkinson, Ken Leung, Mark Rolston, Elizabeth Peña, and Rex Linn play supporting roles. Released on September 18, 1998, the film grossed over $244 million worldwide. The film's box office commercial success led to two sequels: Rush Hour 2 (2001) and Rush Hour 3 (2007).

Plot
On the last day of British rule of Hong Kong on July 1, 1997, Detective Inspector Lee of the Royal Hong Kong Police Force leads a raid at the wharf, hoping to arrest the unidentified, anonymous crime lord Juntao. He finds only Sang, Juntao's right-hand man, who escapes in a boat. Lee recovers numerous Chinese cultural treasures stolen by Juntao, which he presents as a farewell victory gift to his departing superiors, Chinese consul Solon Han and British police commander Thomas Griffin. 

Two months later, after Han takes up his new diplomatic post in Los Angeles, his daughter Soo Yung is kidnapped by Sang while on her way to school. Han calls Lee to assist in the case, but the FBI, afraid Lee's involvement could cause an international incident, pawns him off on the LAPD. Detective James Carter is tricked into "babysitting" Lee as punishment for botching a sting operation; when he finds out, he decides to solve the case.

Carter takes Lee on a sightseeing tour, keeping him away from the embassy while contacting informants about the kidnapping. Lee makes his own way to the Chinese Consulate, where Han and the FBI await news about his daughter. While arguing with Special Agent-in-charge Warren Russ, Carter unwittingly negotiates with Sang, arranging a $50 million ransom drop. The FBI traces the call to a warehouse, where a team of agents are killed by plastic explosive. Spotting Sang nearby, Lee and Carter give chase but he escapes, dropping the detonator. 

Carter's colleague, LAPD bomb expert Tania Johnson, traces it to Clive, a man previously arrested by Carter. Lee presses Clive into revealing his business relationship with Juntao, whom he met at a restaurant in Chinatown, earning Carter's trust. Carter goes to the restaurant alone and sees a surveillance video of Juntao carrying Soo Yung into a van. Lee arrives and saves Carter from Juntao's syndicate, but they are taken off the case as the FBI blames them for the botched ransom drop, with Lee sent back to Hong Kong.

However, Carter refuses to give up and appeals to Johnson for assistance to sneak on board Lee's plane, where he persuades the Hong Kong detective to help stop Juntao together. Griffin later involves himself in the case, revealing more about the HKPF's past with Juntao's syndicate, and implores Han to pay the ransom to avoid further bloodshed. 

At the opening of a Chinese art exhibition at the Los Angeles Convention Center, overseen by Han and Griffin, the now $70 million ransom is delivered, and Carter, Lee, and Johnson enter disguised as guests. Carter orders the guests to evacuate for safety, angering the FBI, but Lee catches Griffin accepting a remote for the detonator from Sang. Lee and Johnson realize Griffin is Juntao when Carter recognizes him from the Chinatown surveillance tape.

Griffin threatens to detonate a bomb vest attached to Soo Yung and demands that the ransom be paid in full, as compensation for the priceless Chinese artifacts which Lee recovered in his raid. Carter sneaks out, locates Soo Yung in the van, and drives it into the building within range of Griffin, preventing him from setting off the vest. 

Johnson gets the vest off Soo Yung, while Griffin heads to the roof with the bag of money. Lee takes the vest and pursues Griffin, while Carter shoots Sang dead in a gunfight. Lee has a brief altercation with Griffin that culminates in both dangling from the rafters. Griffin, holding on to the vest, falls to his death when its straps are torn, but when Lee falls, Carter catches him with a large flag. 

Han and Soo Yung are reunited, and Han sends Carter and Lee on vacation to Hong Kong as a reward. Before Carter leaves, agents Russ and Whitney offer him a position in the FBI, which he mockingly refuses. Carter boards the plane with Lee, who annoyingly starts singing Edwin Starr's "War" off-key.

Cast 
 Jackie Chan as Chief Inspector Lee, a top Hong Kong cop who comes to Los Angeles to help his friend find his kidnapped daughter.
 Chris Tucker as Detective James Carter, a fast-talking street-smart LAPD Detective originally assigned by the FBI to babysit Lee and keep him out of their investigation.
 Tom Wilkinson as Thomas Griffin/Juntao, a British diplomat and colleague of Han's who is secretly the top crime lord in Hong Kong.
 Tzi Ma as Consul Solon Han, Soo Yung's father and a Hong Kong diplomat who has just moved to Los Angeles.
 Ken Leung as Sang, Juntao's second in command.
 Elizabeth Peña as Detective Tania Johnson, an aspiring bomb squad technician in the LAPD who helps Carter rescue Soo-Yung.
 Mark Rolston as Special Agent Warren Russ of the FBI.
 Rex Linn as FBI agent Dan Whitney.
 Chris Penn as Clive Cod, a small time arms dealer who was arrested by Carter in a botched sting operation.
 Philip Baker Hall as Captain Bill Diel, Carter's supervisor.  He gives Carter the FBI assignment as punishment for a botched undercover sting operation.
 Julia Hsu as Soo-Yung Han, Consul Han's daughter who is kidnapped by a criminal organization. She is also a martial arts student of Lee's.
 John Hawkes as "Stucky", Carter's informant.
 Clifton Powell as Luke, Carter's cousin and local crime lord.
 Barry Shabaka Henley as Bobby, a security guard.
 James Yeung as Mr Pong, a Chinese Cook

Production 
Rush Hour began as a spec script written in 1995 by screenwriter Ross LaManna. The screenplay was sold by LaManna's  William Morris agent Alan Gasmer to Hollywood Pictures, a division of the Walt Disney Company, with Arthur Sarkissian attached as producer. After attaching director Ratner and developing the project for more than a year with producers including Sarkissian, Jonathan Glickman and Roger Birnbaum, Disney Studios chief Joe Roth put the project into turnaround, citing concerns about the $34 million budget, and Chan's appeal to American audiences. At the time, Martin Lawrence was attached to the project. Several studios were interested in acquiring the project. New Line Cinema was confident in Ratner, having done Money Talks with him, so they made a hard commitment to a budget and start date for Rush Hour.

Wesley Snipes, Eddie Murphy and Dave Chappelle were considered for the role of Detective James Carter; Murphy turned down the role to do Holy Man instead.

After the success of Rumble in the Bronx, Brett Ratner wanted to put Jackie Chan in a buddy-cop movie, not as a co-star or sidekick but on equal footing with an American star. Ratner flew to South Africa where Chan was filming and pitched the film. A few days later Chan agreed to star in the film and not long after flew to Los Angeles and met Chris Tucker.
Ratner credited Tucker with getting his first feature film Money Talks and thought Tucker and Chan would make a great team.

Reception

Box office 
Rush Hour opened at No. 1 in September 1998 at the North American box office, with a weekend gross of $33 million. Rush Hour grossed over $140 million in the US and $103 million in the rest of the world, for a total worldwide gross over $244 million.

Critical response 
On review aggregator Rotten Tomatoes, the film holds an approval rating of 61% based on 74 reviews with an average score of 6.1/10. The website's critical consensus reads, "A kick-ass addition to the cop-buddy film genre." On Metacritic, the film received a weighted average score of 60 out of 100 based on 23 critics, indicating "mixed or average reviews". Audiences polled by CinemaScore gave the film an average grade of "A" on an A+ to F scale.

Roger Ebert praised both Jackie Chan, for his entertaining action sequences without the use of stunt doubles, and Chris Tucker, for his comical acts in the film, and how they formed an effective comedic duo. Joe Leydon of Variety called it "a frankly formulaic but raucously entertaining action comedy". Leydon is critical of the editing, saying that it "works against Chan by breaking up the flow of his frenzied physicality." Charles Taylor of Salon.com is critical of Hollywood misusing Jackie Chan: "Chan is a one-of-a-kind performer: Bruce Lee crossed with Donald O'Connor in the "Make 'em Laugh" number from Singin' in the Rain. Hollywood needs to stop treating him as if he were one of those fondue sets given as wedding gifts in the '70s: a foreign novelty shoved in a closet due to absolute cluelessness about what to do with it."

Michael O'Sullivan of The Washington Post calls the film a "misbegotten marriage of sweet and sour" and says, "The problem is it can't make up its mind and, unlike Reese's Peanut Butter Cups, the sharply contrasting flavors of these ingredients only leave a bad taste in the customer's mouth." O'Sullivan says Tucker is miscast, the script "perfunctory and sloppy", and the direction "limp, lethargic". Owen Gleiberman of Entertainment Weekly gave the film a grade "C−" and was critical of the buddy comedy, saying, "The two characters barely even have a relationship; they're a union of demographics—the "urban" market meets the slapstick-action market."

Chan has expressed dissatisfaction with the film: "I didn’t like the movie. I still don’t like the movie." Chan continued: "I don’t like the way I speak English, and I don’t know what Chris Tucker is saying". Although he respects the box-office success of Rush Hour, Chan said he preferred the films he made in his native Hong Kong because they delivered more fight scenes: "If you see my Hong Kong movies, you know what happens: Bam bam bam, always Jackie Chan-style, me, 10 minutes of fighting."

Cultural influence 
Rush Hour was the catalyst for the creation of the review-aggregation website Rotten Tomatoes. Senh Duong, the website's founder and a Jackie Chan fan, was inspired to create the website after collecting all the reviews of Chan's Hong Kong action films as they were being released in the United States. In anticipation of Rush Hour, Chan's first major Hollywood crossover, he coded the website in two weeks and the site went live shortly before the film's release.

Sequels 
A sequel, Rush Hour 2, which was primarily set in Hong Kong, was released in 2001. A third film, Rush Hour 3, which was primarily set in Paris, was released on August 10, 2007. Tucker earned $25 million for his role in the third film and Chan received the film's distribution rights in Asia.

In 2007, before the release of Rush Hour 3, Ratner was optimistic about making a fourth film and potentially having it set in Moscow. In 2017 Chan agreed to a potential script for Rush Hour 4 after years of turning down scripts.

Music 

Edwin Starr's "War" was used as the ending theme for the film.

The film's soundtrack features the hit single "Can I Get A..." by Jay-Z, Ja Rule and Amil, as well as tracks by Flesh-n-Bone, Wu-Tang Clan, Dru Hill, Charli Baltimore and Montell Jordan.

The official soundtrack album was also a success, certified platinum on January 21, 1999.

Awards 
 1999 ALMA Awards
 Winner: Outstanding Actress in a Feature Film (Elizabeth Peña)
 1999 BMI Film and TV Awards
 Winner: BMI Film Music Award (Lalo Schifrin)
 1999 Blockbuster Entertainment Awards
 Winner: Favorite Duo- Action/Adventure (Jackie Chan and Chris Tucker)
 Nomination: Favorite Supporting Actress- Action/Adventure (Elizabeth Peña)
 1999 Bogey Awards (Germany)
 Winner: Bogey Awards in Silver
 1999 Golden Screen (Germany)
 Winner: Golden Screen
 1999 Grammy Awards
 Nomination: Best Instrumental Composition Written for a Motion Picture or for Television (Lalo Schifrin)
 1999 NAACP Image Awards
 Nomination: Outstanding Lead Actor in a Motion Picture (Chris Tucker)
 1999 Nickelodeon Kids' Choice Awards (United States)
 Nomination: Favorite Movie Actor (Blimp Award) (Chris Tucker)
 1999 MTV Movie Awards
 Winner: Best On-Screen Duo (Jackie Chan and Chris Tucker)
 Nomination: Best Comedic Performance (Chris Tucker)
 Nomination: Best Fight (Jackie Chan and Chris Tucker) (For the fight against the Chinese gang)
 Nomination: Best Movie Song (Jay-Z) (For Can I Get A...)

Home media

VHS

DVD

UMD

Blu-ray

See also 
 Buddy cop film
 List of films set in Hong Kong
 List of films set in Los Angeles
 Jackie Chan filmography

References

External links 

 
 
 
 
 

1998 films
1998 action comedy films
1998 martial arts films
Films about Chinese Americans
American action comedy films
American buddy cop films
American martial arts films
Fictional portrayals of the Los Angeles Police Department
Films about kidnapping
Kung fu films
1990s martial arts comedy films
1990s police comedy films
American police detective films
Triad films
New Line Cinema films
Films set in Los Angeles
Films set in Hong Kong
Films shot in California
Films shot in Los Angeles
Films shot in Hong Kong
Films set in 1997
Films about child abduction in the United States
Films scored by Lalo Schifrin
Films directed by Brett Ratner
Films produced by Roger Birnbaum
Films about the Federal Bureau of Investigation
1990s buddy cop films
Rush Hour (franchise)
Chinese-language American films
1990s English-language films
1990s American films
American buddy comedy films
1990s Hong Kong films